The East Webburn is a stream in the Dartmoor moors in Devon in south-west England.  It rises on the western side of the moors flowing off the west side of Hameldown ridge.  Its source is less than 1 kilometre south west of Grimspound Bronze Age settlement.  It flows south past Widecombe-in-the-Moor and joins the West Webburn River.  These combined streams then join the River Dart close to the village of Holne.

References

Rivers of Devon
Dartmoor
2EastWebburn